"China Doll" is a song by the English singer-songwriter Julian Cope. Veteran bass sessionist Danny Thompson plays double bass on the track. It is the third and final single released in support of his album My Nation Underground. The ''China Doll' e.p. includes four tracks - see sidebar.

Chart positions

References

1988 songs
1989 singles
Julian Cope songs
Song recordings produced by Ron Fair
Island Records singles